Chimonobambusa is a genus of East Asian bamboo in the grass family. They are native to China, Japan, Vietnam, Myanmar, and the Himalayas.

Species

formerly included
see Ampelocalamus Bambusa Chimonocalamus Drepanostachyum Himalayacalamus Vietnamosasa Yushania

References

 Guadua Bamboo

 
Bambusoideae genera